The 1907–08 season was one of change for the new club.  John Robson departed the club to manage Brighton and Hove Albion, and club secretary Edmund Goodman stepped in to take over the role.  Goodman's first problem was to find a replacement for goalkeeper Bob Hewitson. Hewitson had departed for Oldham, and his early replacement was William Hall of Manchester City. Hall played in the first ten games before losing his place to Josh Johnson, signed from Plymouth Argyle. Johnson swiftly established himself as first choice and would go on to play 295 times for the first team. Dick Harker left for Hibernian and Charlie Wallace was snapped up by Aston Villa, where he would go on to win both the Football League and the FA Cup. Horace Astley, hero of last season's FA Cup exploits, moved on to Heywood United, and Bill Ledger moved on to Sunderland.

Although Goodman brought players into the club, the squad of players used dropped from last season's 26 to 22. George Walker returned to the club from New Brompton, and forward Jimmy Bauchop was signed from Norwich City. John Brearley came to the club from Tottenham and Billy Davies joined from Stoke City.  Davies would become Palace's first International, playing for Wales in their match against Scotland on 7 March 1908. George Woodger was called into the England squad as a reserve for the 4 April 1908 game against Scotland but did not make the first team. Forwards Isaac Owens and George Smith also played for Palace during this season, joining from Bristol Rovers and Bristol City respectively.

Southern Football League First Division

FA Cup

After a good run in the FA Cup last season, Palace were this time allowed to enter the draw in the first round proper. They were eventually dispatched by Grimsby Town in the third round, having been drawn away from home in each tie. Had they managed to beat Grimsby, a rematch with Newcastle would have been the reward.

Squad statistics

Notes

References

Bibliography

 Matthews, Tony (editor). We All Follow The Palace. Juma, 1998. 

Citations

Crystal Palace F.C. seasons
Crystal Palace F.C.